1812 may refer to:

The year 1812
Siberia Airlines Flight 1812, 2001 Black Sea crash 
DRD 1812, a character in Farscape
1812 (1912 film), a Russian film
1812: The Campaign of Napoleon in Russia, a 1972 board wargame

See also
The 1812 Overture, by Tchaikovsky